Pellicano is an Italian-language surname. Notable people with the surname include:

Anthony Pellicano
Julian Pellicano, American conductor
Helene Pellicano, Maltese tennis player
Henrique Pellicano, Brazilian sailor

Italian-language surnames